Edson Barboza Jr. (born January 21, 1986) is a Brazilian-American professional mixed martial artist and former Muay Thai kickboxer who competes in the featherweight division of the Ultimate Fighting Championship and has formerly competed at lightweight. As of December 13, 2022, he is #14 in the UFC featherweight rankings.

Mixed martial arts career

Background
Barboza comes from Nova Friburgo, Rio de Janeiro. He was born prematurely at 28 weeks and given a 50/50 chance of surviving past infancy. At the age of 8, he began practicing and competing in Muay Thai. His professional Muay Thai record is 25–3, with 22 victories by knockout and 17 first-round finishes. Barboza moved to the United States in January 2009.

Barboza's professional MMA career began in April 2009 in Tampa, Florida with a victory over Aaron Steadman via TKO in the first round. In his next fight, in the Renaissance MMA promotion, Barboza defeated Lee King via second-round KO, winning the lightweight title. Barboza defended the belt, also against King, later that year, winning via submission in the first round.

Ring of Combat
Barboza went on to join New Jersey-based promotion Ring of Combat, making his promotional debut at Ring of Combat 28 against Nabih Barakat. He won the fight via KO just over a minute into the first round.

After a second successful title defense in Renaissance MMA, Barboza challenged for the Ring of Combat lightweight belt against Marcelo Guidici. He won the fight via TKO due to leg kicks in the first round.

Barboza's first title defense was originally scheduled for Ring of Combat 31, against Mikhail Malyutin, but, due to his signing with the UFC, he was replaced by Luiz Azeredo.

Ultimate Fighting Championship

2010
Barboza was expected to make his UFC debut against Darren Elkins on November 20, 2010, at UFC 123. However, Elkins was forced from the card with an injury and replaced by newcomer Mike Lullo. Shortly into the third round, Barboza defeated Lullo by TKO due to leg kicks (for the first time in UFC history).

2011
Barboza faced Anthony Njokuani on March 19, 2011, at UFC 128, winning by unanimous decision. Both fighters earned Fight of the Night honors.

Barboza defeated Ross Pearson at UFC 134 via split decision. Both fighters earned Fight of the Night bonus honors.

2012
Barboza faced Terry Etim on January 14, 2012, at UFC 142. He defeated Etim by KO in the third round, becoming the first fighter in UFC history to finish an opponent via wheel kick. The win earned Barboza his first Knockout of the Night and 'Fight of the Night bonus awards

Barboza was expected to face Evan Dunham on May 26, 2012, at UFC 146, but Dunham dropped out of the bout due to injury and was replaced by returning veteran Jamie Varner. Barboza suffered his first professional MMA loss via Knockout in the first round.

2013
Barboza was expected to face Justin Salas on January 19, 2013, at UFC on FX 7. However, Salas was forced out of the bout with an injury and replaced by promotional newcomer Lucas Martins. Barboza defeated Martins via TKO (retirement) at 2:38 of the first round.

Barboza was scheduled to face John Makdessi on July 6, 2013, at UFC 162, but an injury forced Makdessi off the card and he was replaced by Rafaello Oliveira. Barboza won the fight by TKO due to leg kicks in the second round.

Barboza faced Danny Castillo on December 14, 2013, at UFC on Fox 9. After a dominant first round by Castillo, in which he nearly finished Barboza via strikes and then with a submission attempt, Barboza rallied back and won by majority decision. Both fighters earned Fight of the Night honors.

2014
Barboza faced Donald Cerrone on April 19, 2014, at UFC on Fox 11. Despite finding early success with his striking, Barboza was knocked down by a jab and lost via submission at 3:15 of the first round.

Barboza faced Evan Dunham on July 16, 2014, at UFC Fight Night 45. He won the fight via TKO in the first round.

Barboza faced Bobby Green on November 22, 2014, at UFC Fight Night 57. He won the fight via unanimous decision.

2015
Barboza faced Michael Johnson on February 22, 2015, at UFC Fight Night 61. He lost the fight by unanimous decision.

Barboza was expected to face Myles Jury on July 25, 2015, at UFC on Fox 16, replacing an injured Anthony Pettis. However, Jury himself had to pull out due to injury and was subsequently replaced by undefeated Paul Felder. Barboza won the fight via unanimous decision and earned his fifth Fight of the Night bonus award. UFC President Dana White gave Barboza and Felder high praise afterwards, calling the fight "incredible."

Barboza faced Tony Ferguson on December 11, 2015, at The Ultimate Fighter 22 Finale, replacing an injured Khabib Nurmagomedov. After a back-and-forth first round that saw Ferguson docked one point due to an illegal upkick, Barboza lost the fight via submission in the second round. Both fighters earned Fight of the Night honors.

2016
After the loss to Ferguson, Barboza decided to move to New Jersey to train at Mark Henry's and Ricardo Almeida's MMA team. Barboza faced Anthony Pettis on April 23, 2016, at UFC 197. He won via unanimous decision.

Barboza faced Gilbert Melendez on July 23, 2016, at UFC on Fox 20. He won via unanimous decision.

2017
Barboza faced Beneil Dariush on March 11, 2017, at UFC Fight Night 106. He won the fight via knockout due to a flying knee in the second round. Subsequently, he earned his first Performance of the Night bonus award.

Barboza faced Khabib Nurmagomedov on December 30, 2017, at UFC 219. He lost the fight by unanimous decision.

2018
Barboza faced Kevin Lee on April 21, 2018, at UFC Fight Night 128. At the weigh-ins, Lee weighed 157 pounds, one pound over the lightweight non-title fight upper limit of 156 pounds. Subsequently, the bout proceeded at catchweight, and Lee forfeited 20% of his purse to Barboza. Barboza managed to connect with a spinning back kick and  hurt Lee, but went onto lose via TKO due to doctor stoppage in round five.

After losing two consecutive fights, Barboza decided to return to Florida and American Top Team.

Barboza faced Dan Hooker on December 15, 2018, at UFC on Fox 31. He won the fight via TKO in round three.

2019
Barboza faced Justin Gaethje on March 30, 2019, at UFC on ESPN 2. He lost the fight via knockout in round one. This fight earned him the Fight of the Night award.

Barboza faced Paul Felder in a rematch on September 7, 2019 at UFC 242. He lost the fight by a controversial split decision. 13 out of 16 MMA media outlets scored the bout in favor of Barboza, and subsequently the decision was appealed to be overturned. UFC, working in lieu of an athletic commission, denied the appeal.

2020

On December 31, 2019, Barboza announced his intent to move down to the featherweight division. He was expected to face Josh Emmett in a featherweight bout on May 2, 2020 at UFC Fight Night: Hermansson vs. Weidman. However, on April 9, Dana White announced that the event had been postponed. Instead Barboza faced Dan Ige on May 16, 2020 at UFC on ESPN: Overeem vs. Harris. He lost the bout by another controversial split decision. 16 out of 18 MMA media outlets scored the bout in favor of Barboza.

Barboza was expected to face Sodiq Yusuff on  October 11, 2020 at UFC Fight Night 179. However, Yusuff pulled out of the fight on September 22 for undisclosed reasons, and was replaced by Makwan Amirkhani.  He won the fight via unanimous decision.

2021
On February 25, 2021 news surfaced that Barboza had signed a new multi-fight contract with the organization albeit having one fight left on his prevailing contract. In May, Barboza revealed that the contract was signed for six fights.

Barboza faced Shane Burgos on May 15, 2021 at UFC 262. He won the fight via knockout in the third round after Burgos experienced a delayed reaction to being knocked out with a right cross. This fight earned Barboza the $75,000 Fight of the Night bonus award.

Barboza faced Giga Chikadze on August 28, 2021 at UFC on ESPN 30. After a back-and-forth affair, Barboza lost the fight via TKO in round three.

2022
Barboza faced Bryce Mitchell on March 5, 2022 at UFC 272. He lost the fight via unanimous decision.

Barboza was scheduled to face Ilia Topuria on October 29, 2022 at UFC Fight Night 213. However, Barboza withdrew in late September due to a knee injury

 2023 
Barboza is scheduled to face on  Billy Quarantillo April 15, 2023 at UFC on ESPN 44.

Fighting style
Described as a "dyed-in-the-wool striker," Barboza is known for his dangerous kicking game. UFC color commentator Joe Rogan has stated that Barboza is "probably the best kicker in MMA." He scored the first wheel kick knockout in UFC history, and is one of two fighters to finish multiple UFC bouts via leg kicks (the other being Antoni Hardonk). Barboza is also known for his effective use of switch kicks, which have been labeled "exceptionally quick" and "ferocious".

Personal life
Barboza and his wife, Bruna, have a son, Noah and a daughter named Victoria.

Championships and achievements
Mixed martial arts
 Ultimate Fighting Championship
 Fight of the Night (Eight times) vs. Anthony Njokuani, Ross Pearson, Terry Etim, Danny Castillo, Paul Felder, Tony Ferguson, Justin Gaethje & Shane Burgos.
 Tied for most Fight of the Night bonuses in UFC history with Nate Diaz, Frankie Edgar & Dustin Poirier.
 Performance of the Night (One time)  vs. Beneil Dariush 
 Knockout of the Night (One time)  vs. Terry Etim 
 Renaissance MMA
 Renaissance MMA Lightweight Championship (One time)
 Two successful title defenses
 Ring of Combat
 Ring of Combat Lightweight Championship (One time)
 ESPY Award
 Best Play ESPY Award – Nomination (2012)
 World MMA Awards
 2012 Knockout of the Year vs. Terry Etim at UFC 142
 Inside MMA
 Bazzie Award for KO Kick of the Year (2012)  vs. Terry Etim
 Sherdog
 2010 All-Violence Third Team
 2012 Knockout of the Year vs. Terry Etim
 2017 Knockout of the Year vs. Beneil Dariush
 2018 Beatdown of the Year vs. Dan Hooker
 MMAJunkie.com
 2015 December Fight of the Month vs. Tony Ferguson
 2019 September Fight of the Month vs. Paul Felder

Mixed martial arts record

|-
|Loss
|align=center|22–11
|Bryce Mitchell
|Decision (unanimous)
|UFC 272
|
|align=center|3
|align=center|5:00
|Las Vegas, Nevada, United States
|
|-
|Loss
|align=center|22–10
|Giga Chikadze
|TKO (punches)
|UFC on ESPN: Barboza vs. Chikadze
|
|align=center|3
|align=center|1:44
|Las Vegas, Nevada, United States
|
|-
|Win
|align=center|22–9
|Shane Burgos
|KO (punches)
|UFC 262
|
|align=center|3
|align=center|1:16
|Houston, Texas, United States
|
|-
|Win
|align=center|21–9
|Makwan Amirkhani
|Decision (unanimous)
|UFC Fight Night: Moraes vs. Sandhagen
|
|align=center|3
|align=center|5:00
|Abu Dhabi, United Arab Emirates
|
|-
|Loss
|align=center|20–9
|Dan Ige
|Decision (split)
|UFC on ESPN: Overeem vs. Harris
|
|align=center|3
|align=center|5:00
|Jacksonville, Florida, United States
|
|-
|Loss
|align=center|20–8
|Paul Felder
|Decision (split)
|UFC 242 
|
|align=center|3
|align=center|5:00
|Abu Dhabi, United Arab Emirates
|
|-
|Loss
|align=center|20–7
|Justin Gaethje
|KO (punch)
|UFC on ESPN: Barboza vs. Gaethje
|
|align=center|1
|align=center|2:30
|Philadelphia, Pennsylvania, United States
|
|-
|Win
|align=center|20–6
|Dan Hooker
|KO (punch to the body)
|UFC on Fox: Lee vs. Iaquinta 2
|
|align=center|3
|align=center|2:19
|Milwaukee, Wisconsin, United States
|
|-
|Loss
|align=center|19–6
|Kevin Lee
|TKO (doctor stoppage)
|UFC Fight Night: Barboza vs. Lee
|
|align=center|5
|align=center|2:18
|Atlantic City, New Jersey, United States
|
|-
|Loss
|align=center|19–5
|Khabib Nurmagomedov
|Decision (unanimous)
|UFC 219
|
|align=center|3
|align=center|5:00
|Las Vegas, Nevada, United States
|
|-
|Win
|align=center|19–4
|Beneil Dariush
|KO (knee)
|UFC Fight Night: Belfort vs. Gastelum
|
|align=center|2
|align=center|3:35
|Fortaleza, Brazil
|
|-
|Win
|align=center|18–4
|Gilbert Melendez
|Decision (unanimous)
|UFC on Fox: Holm vs. Shevchenko
|
|align=center|3
|align=center|5:00
|Chicago, Illinois, United States
|
|-
|Win
|align=center|17–4
|Anthony Pettis
|Decision (unanimous)
|UFC 197
|
|align=center|3
|align=center|5:00
|Las Vegas, Nevada, United States
|
|-
|Loss
|align=center|16–4
|Tony Ferguson
|Submission (brabo choke)
|The Ultimate Fighter: Team McGregor vs. Team Faber Finale
|
|align=center|2
|align=center|2:54
|Las Vegas, Nevada, United States
|
|-
|Win
|align=center|16–3
|Paul Felder
|Decision (unanimous)
|UFC on Fox: Dillashaw vs. Barão 2
|
|align=center|3
|align=center|5:00
|Chicago, Illinois, United States
|
|-
|Loss
|align=center|15–3
|Michael Johnson
|Decision (unanimous)
|UFC Fight Night: Bigfoot vs. Mir
|
|align=center|3
|align=center|5:00
|Porto Alegre, Brazil
|
|-
|Win
|align=center|15–2
|Bobby Green
|Decision (unanimous)
|UFC Fight Night: Edgar vs. Swanson
|
|align=center| 3
|align=center| 5:00
|Austin, Texas, United States
|
|-
|Win
|align=center|14–2
|Evan Dunham
|TKO (kick to the body and punches)
|UFC Fight Night: Cowboy vs. Miller
|
|align=center| 1
|align=center| 3:06
|Atlantic City, New Jersey, United States
|
|-
|Loss
|align=center|13–2
|Donald Cerrone
|Submission (rear-naked choke)
|UFC on Fox: Werdum vs. Browne
|
|align=center| 1
|align=center| 3:15
|Orlando, Florida, United States
|
|-
|Win
|align=center|13–1
|Danny Castillo
|Decision (majority)
|UFC on Fox: Johnson vs. Benavidez 2
|
|align=center| 3
|align=center| 5:00
|Sacramento, California, United States
|
|-
|Win
|align=center|12–1
|Rafaello Oliveira
|TKO (leg kicks)
|UFC 162
|
|align=center|2
|align=center|1:44
|Las Vegas, Nevada, United States
|
|-
|Win
|align=center|11–1
|Lucas Martins
|TKO (retirement)
|UFC on FX: Belfort vs. Bisping
|
|align=center|1
|align=center|2:38
|São Paulo, Brazil
|
|-
|Loss
|align=center|10–1
|Jamie Varner
|TKO (punches)
|UFC 146
|
|align=center|1
|align=center|3:23
|Las Vegas, Nevada, United States
|
|-
|Win
|align=center|10–0
|Terry Etim
|KO (spinning wheel kick)
|UFC 142
|
|align=center|3
|align=center|2:02
|Rio de Janeiro, Brazil
|
|-
|Win
|align=center|9–0
|Ross Pearson
|Decision (split)
|UFC 134
|
|align=center|3
|align=center|5:00
|Rio de Janeiro, Brazil
|
|-
|Win
|align=center| 8–0
|Anthony Njokuani
|Decision (unanimous)
|UFC 128
|
|align=center|3
|align=center|5:00
|Newark, New Jersey, United States
|
|-
|Win
|align=center| 7–0
|Mike Lullo
|TKO (leg kicks)
|UFC 123
|
|align=center|3
|align=center|0:26
|Auburn Hills, Michigan, United States
|
|-
|Win
|align=center| 6–0
|Marcelo Guidici
|TKO (leg kicks)
|Ring of Combat 30
|
|align=center| 1
|align=center| 3:01
|Atlantic City, New Jersey, United States
|
|-
|Win
|align=center| 5–0
|Jose Figueroa
|KO (punch)
|Renaissance MMA 16
|
|align=center|1
|align=center|3:55
|New Orleans, Louisiana, United States
|
|-
|Win
|align=center| 4–0
|Nabih Barakat
|KO (punches)
|Ring of Combat 28
|
|align=center|1
|align=center|1:09
|Atlantic City, New Jersey, United States
|
|-
|Win
|align=center|3–0
|Lee King
|Submission (anaconda choke)
|Renaissance MMA 15
|
|align=center|1
|align=center|2:04
|New Orleans, Louisiana, United States
|
|-
|Win
|align=center|2–0
|Lee King
|KO (punches)
|Renaissance MMA 12
|
|align=center|2
|align=center|1:14
|New Orleans, Louisiana, United States
|
|-
|Win
|align=center|1–0
|Aaron Steadman
|TKO ( punches)
|Real Fighting Championships 17
|
|align=center|1
|align=center|3:34
|Tampa, Florida, United States
|
|-

Muay Thai & Kickboxing record

|-  style="background:#cfc;"
| 2007-11-10 || Win||align=left| Tadeu San Martino || Demolition Fight VI, Final || São Paulo, Brazil || Decision || 3 || 3:00
|-
! style=background:white colspan=9 |

|-  style="background:#cfc;"
| 2007-11-10 || Win||align=left| Marfio Canoletti || Demolition Fight VI, Semi Final || São Paulo, Brazil || KO (Punches)|| 1 || 2:46

|-  style="background:#cfc;"
| 2007-11-10 || Win||align=left| Marcos Rodrigues || Demolition Fight VI, Quarter Final || São Paulo, Brazil || TKO (Doctor Stoppage)|| 1 || 3:00

|-  style="background:#fbb;"
| 2007-03-29 || Loss||align=left| Tadeu San Martino || GP la Gara, Final || Brazil || KO (Punches)|| 3 ||

|-  style="background:#cfc;"
| 2006-11-18 || Win||align=left| Jair Portilho || Festival de Muay Thai|| Rio, Brazil || KO || 2 ||

|-  style="background:#fbb;"
| 2006-09-23 || Loss||align=left| Bruno Carvalho || Demolition Fight IV || São Paulo, Brazil || Decision || 3 || 3:00
|-
! style=background:white colspan=9 |

|-  style="background:#cfc;"
| 2005-10-10 || Win||align=left| Flavio Pardinho || Demolition Fight II || São Paulo, Brazil || KO || 3 || 1:11

|-  style="background:#fbb;"
|  || Loss||align=left| Bruno Carvalho || AFC BR I || Brazil || Decision || 5 || 3:00
|-
| colspan=9 | Legend'':

See also
List of current UFC fighters
List of male mixed martial artists

References

External links

Living people
1986 births
Brazilian male mixed martial artists
Lightweight mixed martial artists
Brazilian male kickboxers
Welterweight kickboxers
Brazilian practitioners of Brazilian jiu-jitsu
Brazilian Muay Thai practitioners
Mixed martial artists utilizing Muay Thai
Mixed martial artists utilizing taekwondo
Mixed martial artists utilizing boxing
Mixed martial artists utilizing Brazilian jiu-jitsu
People from Nova Friburgo
Brazilian expatriates in the United States
Brazilian male taekwondo practitioners
Ultimate Fighting Championship male fighters
Sportspeople from Rio de Janeiro (state)